The 1900 Virginia Orange and Blue football team represented the University of Virginia as an independent during the 1900 college football season. Led by second-year coach Archie Hoxton, the team went 7–2–1 and claims a Southern championship.  The team was captained by tackle John Loyd. The Orange and Blue defeated Sewanee, to give the Tigers its first loss since 1897.

Preseason
Archie Hoxton was in his second season as head coach. William Choice transferred from rival VPI.

Schedule

Season summary

Washington and Lee
The season opened with a 28–0 defeat of the Washington and Lee Generals.

The starting lineup was Hobson (left end), Loyd (left tackle), Harris (left guard), Montgomery (center), Haskell (right guard), Walker (right tackle), McCall (right end). Mallory (quarterback), Dabney (left halfback), Carroll (right halfback), and Coleman (fullback).

Richmond
In the second week of play, Virginia defeated Richmond 51–0.

The starting lineup was Hobson (left end), Loyd (left tackle), Harris (left guard), Montgomery (center), Haskell (right guard), Walker (right tackle), Bride (right end). Mallory (quarterback), Carroll (left halfback), Nalle (right halfback), and Coleman (fullback).

Carlisle
On a muddy field, the Carlisle Indians beat Virginia 2–16, Once during the game, Bradley Walker grabbed Hawley Pierce, Carlisle's biggest player, and carried him ten yards with him dangling over his shoulder.

The starting lineup was Bride (left end), Loyd (left tackle), Harris (left guard), Montgomery (center), Haskel (right guard), Walker (right tackle), Hobson (right end). Mallory (quarterback), Dabney (left halfback), Nalle (right halfback), and Coleman (fullback).

Johns Hopkins
Virginia beat Johns Hopkins 40–0. Walker had several long runs for touchdown in the second half.

The starting lineup was Hobson (left end), Loyd (left tackle), Choice (left guard), Montgomery (center), Haskel (right guard), Walker (right tackle), Bride (right end). Tutwiler (quarterback), Dabney (left halfback), Nalle (right halfback), and Coleman (fullback).

VMI
VMI fought Virginia to a scoreless tie. The game was called the greatest ever played in Lexington. George Marshall played for VMI.

The starting lineup was Hobson (left end), Loyd (left tackle), Choice (left guard), Montgomery (center), Haskell (right guard), Walker (right tackle), Bride (right end). Tutwiler (quarterback), Nalle (left halfback), Dabney (right halfback), and Coleman (fullback).

Gallaudet
Virginia beat Gallaudet 34–0. A Brodie Nalle touchdown was the highlight of the game.

The starting lineup was Hobson (left end), Loyd (left tackle), Harris (left guard), Montgomery (center), Haskel (right guard), Benet (right tackle), Bride (right end). Nalle (quarterback), Dabney (left halfback), Coleman (right halfback), and Walker (fullback).

VPI
Virginia defeated VPI 17–5. Hunter Carpenter had in earlier games used the alias "Walter Brown" because his father had forbidden him to play football.

The starting lineup was Hobson (left end), Loyd (left tackle), Harris (left guard), Montgomery (center), Haskel (right guard), Benet (right tackle), Bride (right end). Nalle (quarterback), Dabney (left halfback), Coleman (right halfback), and Walker (fullback).

Georgetown
Two fumbles cost Virginia the game against Georgetown, losing 0–10.

The starting lineup was Hobson (left end), Waters (left tackle), Choice (left guard), Montgomery (center), Haskel (right guard), Benet (right tackle), Bride (right end). Nalle (quarterback), Dabney (left halfback), Coleman (right halfback), and Walker (fullback).

North Carolina
In the rivalry game with North Carolina in Norfolk, Virginia beat the Tar Heels 17–0. The Stonewall Brigade Band accompanied the Virginia team, and played in the hotel lobby.

The starting lineup was Bride (left end), Loyd (left tackle), Choice (left guard), Montgomery (center), Haskell (right guard), Benet (right tackle), Watters (right end). Nalle (quarterback), Dabney (left halfback), Coleman (right halfback), and Walker (fullback).

Sewanee
To close the season in Richmond, the Orange and Blue defeated Sewanee, 17–5, to capture a Southern championship.

The starting lineup was Hobson (left end), Loyd (left tackle), Choice (left guard), Montgomery (center), Haskel (right guard), Benet (right tackle), Bride (right end). Nalle (quarterback), Dabney (left halfback), Coleman (right halfback), and Walker (fullback).

Postseason

Virginia claimed the Southern championship.

Caspar Whitney, the originator of the concept of the All-America team, selected an All-Southern eleven for Outing. Hobson, Loyd, Choice, and Dabney all made his team. Walker and Nalle he ruled ineligible.  W. H. Hoge also selected an All-Southern team. On his team was Dabney and Walker, with Haskel, Coleman, and Nalle as substitutes.

Players

Line

Backfield

Substitutes

References

Virginia
Virginia Cavaliers football seasons
Virginia Orange and Blue football